Lichenoconium lichenicola is a species of lichenicolous fungus belonging to the class Dothideomycetes.

References

Dothideomycetes
Fungi described in 1927